Jackie Taylor is the name of:
 Jackie Taylor (actress), founder of the Black Ensemble Theater
 Jackie Taylor (90210), a character on Beverly Hills, 90210
 Jackie Lynn Taylor (1925–2014), American former child actress
 Jackie Taylor (politician) (1935–2008), Oregon politician